Tetyana "Tanya" Kozyrenko (born 4 May 1996) is a Ukrainian footballer, who plays for Chertanovo Moscow in the Women's Football League.

Career

Club

Kozyrenko began football playing at the age of 16 in the club WFC Lehenda Chernihiv in Chernihiv. She debuted in the 2012–13 season of the Ukrainian Women's League. After two years of appearing in 15 league matches and netting nine goals, she moved to Belarus joining Nadezhda in Mogilev, where she played in 17 games and scored six goals. She returned then to her former club in Ukraine after one season. Kozyrenko 
netted eight goals in ten matches for WFC Lehenda Chernihiv in the 2015–16 season. In February 2016, she went to Lithuania to play for Gintra Universitetas in the A Lyga Women. She played for FK Gintra in three matches of the 2016–17 UEFA Women's Champions League qualifying round – Group 7, and scored five goals in total. In May 2017, it was reported that she suffered a meniscus tear, and could return to the field four months after a surgery. In the 2017–18 season, she returned home to play for Panthers FC in Uman. She capped in seven matches scoring eight goals.

Kozyrenko moved to Turkey in February 2018 to play for the Istanbul-based club Ataşehir Belediyespor in the Turkish Women's First Football League. She signed a contract for one year with 2-year option. She scored four goals of five in total in her first match. Later in 2018, she played for Russian club Zvezda-2005 in Perm, and became a Russian Cup winner.

In the beginning of the second half of the 2018–19 Turkish Women's League season, she transferred to the Gaziantep-based ALG Spor, which was promoted newly to the First League.

International
Kozyrenko became a member of the Ukraine U-17 and debuted in the 2012 UEFA Women's Under-17 Championship qualification – Group 9 match against Azerbaijan U-17 on 30 September 2011. She later was a member of the Ukraine U-19 teams.
Kozyrenko played for the Ukraine national team in the 2017 Four Nations Tournament held in Foshan, China. She scored two goals against Myanmar.

In 2018, she played in three matches of the 2019 FIFA Women's World Cup qualification – UEFA Group 4 for Ukraine.

International goals

Career statistics
.

Honours
 Turkish Women's First League
 Ataşehir Belediyespor
 Winners (1): 2017–18

 AALG Spor
 Runners-up (1): 2018–19

 Russian Women's Supreme Division
 Zvezda-2005
 Third places (1): 2018

References

External links 
 
 

Living people
1996 births
People from Feodosia
Ukrainian women's footballers
Women's association football forwards
WFC Lehenda-ShVSM Chernihiv players
WFC Pantery Uman players
Ataşehir Belediyespor players
Zvezda 2005 Perm players
ALG Spor players
Gintra Universitetas players
WFC Lokomotiv Moscow players
Turkish Women's Football Super League players
Ukraine women's international footballers
Ukrainian expatriate women's footballers
Expatriate women's footballers in Russia
Ukrainian expatriate sportspeople in Russia
Expatriate women's footballers in Belarus
Ukrainian expatriate sportspeople in Belarus
Expatriate women's footballers in Lithuania
Ukrainian expatriate sportspeople in Lithuania
Expatriate women's footballers in Turkey
Ukrainian expatriate sportspeople in Turkey